Izazi is an administrative ward in the Iringa Rural district of the Iringa Region of Tanzania. In 2016 the Tanzania National Bureau of Statistics report there were 5,526 people in the ward, from 5,281 in 2012.

Villages / vitongoji 
The ward has 3 villages and 17 vitongoji.

 Makuka
 Itemagwe
 Magombwe
 Majengo
 Makuka A
 Makuka B
 Mondomela
 Nyamahato
 Izazi
 Barabarani
 Chekechea
 Ihanyi
 Izazi Madukani
 Kiwanjani
 Sokoni
 Mnadani
 Kilamba Kitali
 Mabati
 Magungu
 Mjimwema
 Mnadani

References 

Wards of Iringa Region